The Scottish International Airshow (TSIA) is an annual Air Show taking place at Ayr, Scotland. Founded in 2014, the air show features a variety of aircraft such as Biplanes, Fighter Jets, Aerobatic aircraft, Seaplanes, and much more.

Venue
TSIA is held at Ayr Low Green.

Operation
TSIA is created and hosted by the Scottish International Airshow. Inside of the air show area, it is patrolled by police and security guards. Typically, the order of the aircraft's are the Typhoon, older planes such as the Douglas DC3 and The Beech 18's. Followed by the Seaplanes and then the F18 and the red arrows. In between these aircraft there are some smaller and older planes that fly in formation.

At the airshow, there are food stands, stalls, Various Funfair Rides, exhibitions from the British Armed Forces and British police such as The British Army, Royal Air Force and the Royal Navy.

Aircraft
2018 Airshow Aircraft

Swiss Airforce F/A-18C supersonic jet display
Royal Navy Hawker Sea Fury
RAF Tutor Aircraft Grob G 115
Consolidated PBY Catalina Flying Boat
RAF Typhoon supersonic jet
The Red Arrows
RAF Lancaster bomber, Spitfire and Hawker Hurricane
Cessna 172 sea plane (does a water landing)
Formation of a Douglas DC3 and three Beech 18's
AutoGyro Calidus
The Global Stars aerobatic team (4 Extra 300's)
Pitts S1 aerobatic display
Scottish Aviation Bulldog & De Havilland Canada DHC-1 Chipmunk
Boeing-Stearman
De Havilland Dragonfly

References

Air shows
Ayr